Otak may refer to:

Otak-otak, a fish cake eaten throughout Malaysia, Singapore, and Indonesia
Otaks, a species in the fictional world of Earthsea
 Otak, a Baithak in villages of Sindh.